Therani is a village in Chittoor district in the state of Andhra Pradesh in India. The village is home to a 500-year-old Vaikuntanatha temple dedicated to Lord Vishnu.
Located amidst the hills of Nagari, it offers a view of the jagged peaks of the famous Nagari Nose of the southernmost portions of the Eastern Ghats.

See also
Vaikuntanatha Temple, Therani

Local images

References

Villages in Chittoor district